Ugljare may refer to:

, a village near Gnjilane
Ugljare, Kosovo Polje, a village near Kosovo Polje
, a village near Zubin Potok

See also
Uglara (disambiguation)